Roger de Ville (born 21 January 1935) is a former English cricketer who played first-class cricket for Derbyshire in 1963 and 1964.

De Ville was born at Uttoxeter, Staffordshire. He began playing for Derbyshire in 1955, when he turned out for the  Second XI in the Minor Counties Championship. In the 1963 season he was brought into the first team as a lower-order batsman. He played two games in the season. In the 1964 season he played one more game for the Derbyshire against Oxford University.

De Ville was a right-handed batsman who played five innings in three first-class matches with an average of 8.66 and a top score of 17. He was a leg-break bowler, but his lack of consistency saw him dropped in favour of quicker bowlers such as Brian Jackson. He took two wickets at an average of 73.00 and a best performance of 2 for 47.

De Ville moved to Staffordshire, where he played in the Minor Counties Championship until 1973. He played two ListA matches for Staffordshire. Later in his career, he played for Marylebone Cricket Club, until 1977.

References

1935 births
English cricketers
Living people
Derbyshire cricketers
Staffordshire cricketers
People from Uttoxeter